Félix Huete Pinedo (25 August 1914 – 21 May 1991) was a Spanish professional association football player. He was born in Ciudad Real, Spain.

Career
He played as a midfielder. He became an important player for Real Madrid C.F. in the 1940s, playing for the Spanish side from 1941 to 1948. He also played for Real Murcia, Racing de Santander and Malacitano.

He played 154 matches for Real Madrid in La Liga, scoring once. He also played 27 times in Copa del Rey.

Titles
 2 Copa del Rey

International selection
He played only one match for Spain national football team on 6 June 1946, in Spain's defeat with Ireland.

External links
 
 

Real Madrid CF players
Spanish footballers
Spain international footballers
Real Murcia players
Racing de Santander players
1914 births
1991 deaths
Association football midfielders